Evonne Hsu, also known as Hsu Hui-hsin (born December 5, 1976 in Longview, Texas, United States), is a Taiwanese-American Mandopop singer. Hsu is managed by Music Nation Wingman Limited and signed by Universal Music Taiwan since her debut in 2002.

Early life
Evonne Hsu was born in Longview, Texas, United States.  Hsu grew up with a love for singing and dancing but had chosen to major in psychology at the University of Texas at Austin when a musical arranger friend convinced her to make a demo tape of her singing.

Career
Hsu released her debut album To Be Happy in January 2002. To date, she has released eight albums and has also published a book. On July 7, 2007 Hsu performed at the Chinese leg of Live Earth in Shanghai.

Discography

Albums

Soundtracks
Love Train Original Soundtrack
Snow.Wolf.Lake Original Soundtrack

Awards

Films
 Legend of Chinese Titans (2012)
 The Harbor 2012 (2012)

References

External links

  Evonne Hsu@Music Nation Wingman
  Evonne Hsu@Universal Music Taiwan

1976 births
Living people
American musicians of Taiwanese descent
American women musicians of Chinese descent
Taiwanese Mandopop singers
People from Longview, Texas
Musicians from Texas
21st-century Taiwanese singers
21st-century Taiwanese women singers
21st-century American women